Zalazar is a surname. Notable people with the surname include:

Domingo Zalazar (born 1986), Argentine footballer
José Zalazar (born 1963), Uruguayan footballer
Kuki Zalazar (born 1998), Spanish footballer
Rodrigo Zalazar (born 1999), Uruguayan footballer
Víctor Zalazar (born 1935), Argentine boxer